Bad Marriage Mountain is located in the Lewis Range, Glacier National Park in the U.S. state of Montana.  The mountain was named by Superintendent E. T. Scoyen for a Blackfoot Indian leader Bad Married.  Bad Marriage Mountain became the accepted colloquial name.  At one time, the summit was called Elk Tongue by J.W. Schultz, an early chronicler of park geography and activities.  Because no Blackfoot equivalent to Elk Tongue was found, the English name was dropped and Bad Marriage Mountain became the official name.

See also
 Mountains and mountain ranges of Glacier National Park (U.S.)

References

External links 
 Bad Marriage Mountain photo: Flickr

Mountains of Glacier County, Montana
Mountains of Glacier National Park (U.S.)
Lewis Range
Mountains of Montana